The discography of Darren Hayes, an Australian pop singer, consists of five studio albums, one compilation album, twenty-two singles, nineteen music videos, and four video albums. He released his first two studio albums via Columbia Records, and since 2007, has released music through his own record label, Powdered Sugar. Including his work with Savage Garden, Hayes has sold more than 39 million albums worldwide, of which five million have been sold during his solo career. His five studio albums include Spin (2002), The Tension and the Spark (2004), both of which were released by Columbia; Hayes left the label and went on to release four studio albums, This Delicate Thing We've Made (2007), Secret Codes and Battleships (2011), and his most recent studio album, Homosexual, which was released on 7 October 2022.

Albums

Studio albums

Collaboration albums

Video albums

Singles

As lead artist

As featured artist

Other appearances

Music videos

See also
Savage Garden discography

Notes

References

Discography
Discographies of Australian artists
Pop music discographies